KNOX is the trade mark of the oldest incense manufacturers in Germany. It is based in the little village of Mohorn-Grund in the borough of Wilsdruff and run by the firm of Hermann Zwetz, Chemist's.

In 1865 the chemist, whose name the firm now bears, sold the incense candles, known as Räucherkerzchen as a remedy for whooping cough and asthma. Only later were the little candles used for Christmas festivities.

Today about 50 tonnes of incense products are manufactured annually in 30 scent varieties in the factory premises that were newly built in 1997. The company, which continued in private hands even in East German times, also has a small museum in which there is much to discover about incense products, especially from Saxony, but also from the rest of the world. They are used especially in the wooden toy figures known as Räuchermänner.

External links 
Web presence of the firm

German brands
Companies based in Saxony
Wilsdruff
Chemical companies of Germany